San Ignacio de la Redención was a fort established in 1606 by Alonso García de Ramón, Royal Governor of Chile, in a plain, located in the region of Boroa on the north bank of the Cautín River. In forty days he constructed a large fort, surrounded by a wide ditch, defended by a solid and thick wood palisade, and provided with extensive buildings to hold a large garrison. He intended the following year to turn it into a city.  However, the garrison, under its commander Maestro de Campo Rodulfo Lisperger, and most of his garrison were ambushed and annihilated that same year and the fort was abandoned.

See also
 La Frontera, Chile

Sources 
  Francisco Solano Asta Buruaga y Cienfuegos Diccionario geográfico  de la República de Chile, SEGUNDA EDICIÓN CORREGIDA Y AUMENTADA, NUEVA YORK, D. APPLETON Y COMPAÑÍA. 1899.  Pg.889 Voroa
 Diego Barros Arana,  Historia general de Chile. Tomo tercero
  Capítulo XXI, pg. 348

Populated places established in 1606
Colonial fortifications in Chile
1606 establishments in the Spanish Empire